Ferhat Çökmüş (born 14 February 1985) is a footballer who plays for Donatim. Born in Switzerland, he represented Turkey at under-21 international level.

Club career
He plays in either the rightback or defensive midfielder positions. Standing at 180 cm and weighing 75 kg, he has previously played for FC Ostermundigen, BSC Young Boys and Trabzonspor. His jersey number is 85. He holds both Turkish and Switzerland passports.

References

External links
 
 
 
 

1985 births
Footballers from Bern
Swiss people of Turkish descent
Living people
Turkish footballers
Turkey B international footballers
Turkey under-21 international footballers
Swiss men's footballers
Association football defenders
BSC Young Boys players
Trabzonspor footballers
Manisaspor footballers
Orduspor footballers
Adana Demirspor footballers
FC Wil players
Swiss 1. Liga (football) players
Swiss Super League players
Süper Lig players
TFF First League players
Swiss Challenge League players
2. Liga Interregional players